Toureen Peakaun is an ancient church located in County Tipperary, Ireland.

Location

Description

In the 7th century, St Alban chose the Glen of Aherlow region as the location for a monastery. The site, known as Toureen Peakaun, features the ruins of a rectangular 12th century AD church. Of note are the cross-slab fragments in the wall and remains of crosses between the church and gate.

Today, pilgrims continue to visit the church and the nearby holy well.

References

National Monuments in County Tipperary
Archaeological sites in County Tipperary